Paroa is a town and union council of Dera Ismail Khan District in Khyber Pakhtunkhwa province of Pakistan. It is located at 31°33'25N 70°45'32E and has an altitude of 154 metres (508 feet).

References

Union councils of Dera Ismail Khan District
Populated places in Dera Ismail Khan District